Torny Pedersen (born 18 February 1946 in Namsos) is a Norwegian politician for the Labour Party.

She was elected to the Norwegian Parliament from Nordland in 1997, and has been re-elected on two occasions.

Pedersen was a member of Fauske municipality council from 1987 to 1991, later serving as deputy mayor 1995–1997.

References

1946 births
Living people
Members of the Storting
Nordland politicians
Labour Party (Norway) politicians
21st-century Norwegian politicians
20th-century Norwegian politicians
People from Namsos